The New Cathedral Cemetery is a  Roman Catholic cemetery, with 125 acres, located on the westside of Baltimore, Maryland, at 4300 Old Frederick Road. It is the final resting place of 110,000 people, including numerous individuals who played important roles in Maryland history. New Cathedral opened in 1871, replacing Cathedral Cemetery.

The cemetery contains several players from the Baltimore Orioles, including four members of the Baseball Hall of Fame: John McGraw, Joseph Kelley, Ned Hanlon, and Wilbert Robinson. It is believed that no other cemetery has so many Hall of Famers.

Other notable burials
 Ephraim Francis Baldwin
 John Lee Carroll
 Charles Pearce Coady
 Miriam Cooper
 Frederick L. Dewberry (1921–1990), Baltimore County Executive, Deputy Secretary of the Maryland Department of Transportation
 Edmund Francis Dunne
 George Proctor Kane (1817–1878), Mayor of Baltimore and Marshal of Police in Baltimore
 Otis Keilholtz (1838–1883), Speaker of the Maryland House of Delegates and ex-officio mayor of Baltimore
 Ambrose Jerome Kennedy
 John Lee
 J. R. Malone
 Bobby Mathews
 Henry May (1816–1866), U.S. Representative from Maryland
 Thomas Francis McNulty (1859–1932), American sheriff and composer
 Hugh Allen Meade
 John Mullan (road builder)
 Herbert O'Conor
 Eugene O'Dunne
 Vincent Luke Palmisano
 Theodore Wells Pietsch
 Wilbert Robinson
 Walt Smallwood
 John Surratt
 George J. Turner

References

Cemeteries in Baltimore
Roman Catholic cemeteries in the United States